Pyrgomatidae is a family of barnacles belonging to the order Balanomorpha.

Genera
The following genera are members of the family Pyrgomatidae:
Subfamily Ceratoconchinae Newman & Ross, 1976
 Ceratoconcha Kramberger-Gorjanovic, 1889
 †Eoceratoconcha Newman & Ladd, 1974
Subfamily Megatrematinae Holthuis, 1982
 Adna Sowerby, 1823
 Megatrema Sowerby, 1823
 Memagreta Ross & Pitombo, 2002
 Pyrgomina Baluk & Radwanski, 1967
Subfamily Pyrgomatinae Gray, 1825
 Ahoekia Ross & Newman, 1995
 Arossella Anderson, 1993
 Australhoekia Ross & Newman, 2000
 Cantellius Ross & Newman, 1973
 Cionophorus Ross & Newman, 2001
 Creusia Leach, 1817
 Darwiniella Anderson, 1992
 Eohoekia Ross & Newman, 1995
 Galkinius Perreault, 2014
 Hiroa Ross & Newman, 1973
 Hoekia Ross & Newman, 1973
 Neopyrgoma Ross & Newman, 2002
 Neotrevathana Ross, 1999
 Nobia Sowerby, 1839
 Parahoekia Ross & Newman, 1995
 Pyrgoma Leach, 1817
 Pyrgopsella Zullo, 1967
 Pyrgospongia Achituv & Simon-Blecher, 2006
 Savignium Leach, 1825
 Trevathana Anderson, 1992

References

Barnacles